Jessica Pegula and Zheng Saisai were the defending champions, having won the event in 2012, but Pegula chose not to participate. Zheng paired up with Xu Yifan, but they lost in the quarterfinals.

Luksika Kumkhum and Erika Sema won the event, defeating Nao Hibino and Riko Sawayanagi in the final, 6–4, 6–3.

Seeds

Draw

References 
 Draw

Kangaroo Cup - Doubles
Kangaroo Cup
2013 in Japanese tennis